The Sierra Leonean Ambassador to Russia is the official representative of the Government of Sierra Leone to the Government of Russia.

List of representatives

References 

Ambassadors of Sierra Leone to Russia
Russia
Sierra Leone